Microcleptes is a genus of longhorn beetles of the subfamily Lamiinae, containing the following species:

 Microcleptes aranea Newman, 1840
 Microcleptes variolosus Fairmaie & Germain, 1859

References

Parmenini